In architecture, a cupola is a relatively small, most often dome-like, tall structure on top of a building. Often used to provide a lookout or to admit light and air, it usually crowns a larger roof or dome.

The word derives, via Italian, from lower Latin cupula (classical Latin cupella),  (Latin cupa), indicating a vault resembling an upside-down cup.

Background
The cupola evolved during the Renaissance from the older oculus. Being weatherproof, the cupola was better suited to the wetter climates of northern Europe.  The chhatri, seen in Indian architecture, fits the definition of a cupola when it is used atop a larger structure.

Cupolas often serve as a belfry, belvedere, or roof lantern above a main roof. In other cases they may crown a spire, tower, or turret. Barns often have cupolas for ventilation.

Cupolas can also appear as small buildings in their own right.

The square, dome-like segment of a North American railroad train caboose that contains the second-level or "angel" seats is also called a cupola.

Gallery

On armoured vehicles
The term  cupola can also refer to the protrusions atop an armoured fighting vehicle due to their distinctive dome-like appearance. They allow crew or personnel to observe, offering very good all round vision, or even field weaponry, without being exposed to incoming fire. Later designs, however, became progressively flatter and less prominent as technology evolved to allow designers to reduce the profile of their vehicles.

See also

 Daylighting
 Windcatcher
 Cupola (ISS module)

Notes

References

Architectural elements
Cupola